Douglas Edwin McCaig (February 24, 1919 – June 6, 1982) was a Canadian ice hockey player who played 263 games in the National Hockey League with the Detroit Red Wings and Chicago Black Hawks between 1941 and 1951.

Career statistics

Regular season and playoffs

External links
 

1919 births
1982 deaths
Canadian expatriates in the United States
Canadian ice hockey defencemen
Chicago Blackhawks players
Detroit Red Wings players
Fort Wayne Komets players
Ice hockey people from Ontario
Indianapolis Capitals players
Milwaukee Sea Gulls players
Ontario Hockey Association Senior A League (1890–1979) players
St. Louis Flyers players
Sportspeople from Guelph
Toledo Mercurys players